Sirkan (also Romanized as Sīrkān) is a city in Bam Pasht District, Saravan County, Sistan and Baluchestan province, Iran. At the 2006 census, its population was 1,347, in 284 families. At the 2016 census, its population had risen to 2,196, in 557 families.

Education 
Sirkan is regarded as one of the most underdeveloped regions in Iran, but the students have shown unexpected performance in the Iranian University Entrance Exam. 

Primary schools:
 Meysam School
 Khadijah Kobra School

Problems 
People in Sirkan do not have access to freshwater.

References

Populated places in Saravan County
Cities in Sistan and Baluchestan Province